John Mitchell ( – 29 August 1859) was an English Tory politician.

Life
He was the son of David Mitchell, a Jamaica planter, and nephew of William Mitchell, a plantation owner and attorney there, who was also a Westminster politician. He was educated at Westminster School and Christ Church, Oxford. He entered Lincoln's Inn in 1803, and was called to the bar in 1808.

Mitchell was elected at the 1818 general election as a Member of Parliament (MP) for Kingston-upon-Hull, and held the seat until the 1826 general election,
when he did not contest Hull.

References

1781 births
1859 deaths
Tory MPs (pre-1834)
Members of the Parliament of the United Kingdom for English constituencies
UK MPs 1818–1820
UK MPs 1820–1826